Basukinath railway station (station code BSKH) is at Basukinath city in Dumka district in the Indian state of Jharkhand on the Jasidih–Rampurhat section. It is in the Asansol Division of the Eastern Railway zone of the Indian Railways.

The railway line has single  broad gauge track from Jasidih junction in Deoghar district in Santhal Pargana division of Jharkhand to Rampurhat in Birbhum district of West Bengal. This railway track to Dumka is a boon for Santhal Pargana Division.

History
Basukinath railway station became operation in 2011. The  segment from Jasidih to Dumka became operational on 12 July 2011. This railway line was sanctioned in 1997–98 Railway Budget but the land acquisition work started after 2002 and major construction started after 2007. First intercity express between Dumka and Ranchi started on 24 September 2012 stops at Basukinath. It run five days a week except Thursday and Sunday.

Current projects
Ongoing new railway line survey between Basukinath and Chitra is taken by the Indian Railways.

Trains 
Three passenger trains run between Jasidih junction and Dumka stops at Basukinath. One intercity express train between Dumka and Ranchi also running daily stop at Basukinath.

Facilities 
The major facilities available at Basukinath station are waiting rooms, computerised reservation facility, reservation counter and vehicle parking. The station also has toilets, refreshment room, a tea stall and a book stall.

Platforms
There are a total of 2 platforms and 3 tracks. The platforms are connected by foot overbridge. These platforms are built to accumulate 24 coaches express train.

Station layout

Track layout

Nearest Airport
The nearest airports are Birsa Munda Airport at Ranchi, Gaya Airport, Lok Nayak Jayaprakash Airport at Patna and Netaji Subhas Chandra Bose International Airport at Kolkata.

Gallery

See also

References

External links 

Basukinath station map

 Official website of the Dumka district

Railway stations in Dumka district
Asansol railway division
Railway stations opened in 2011